General Security Directorate or variants may refer to:

 General Directorate of Security (Turkey) (Emniyet Genel Müdürlüğü)
 General Security Directorate (Iraq), (Mudiriyat al-Amn al-Amma)
 Directorate of General Security, Iraqi secret police dissolved in 2003
 General Security Directorate (Lebanon), (Sûreté générale)
 General Security Directorate (Syria), (Idarat al-Amn al-'Amm)
 General Directorate of Security (Portugal) (Direção-Geral de Segurança)
 General Directorate of Public Security, Saudi Arabia

See also
 Directorate-General for Human Resources and Security of the European Commission